is a private junior women's college in Konan-ku, Yokohama, Kanagawa Prefecture, Japan.

The predecessor of the school was established in 1940 as a teachers school for kindergarten and nursery school children. It became a junior college in 1966 and relocated to its present location in 1979.

External links
 Official website 

Educational institutions established in 1966
Private universities and colleges in Japan
Japanese junior colleges
Women's universities and colleges in Japan
Universities and colleges in Yokohama
1966 establishments in Japan